Joseph Desler Costa is a photographer and musician born (1981) in Pittsburgh, Pennsylvania.  Costa is a member of the Indie music group L'Altra and has released music under the names Young Boy and  Costa Music*.  Costa has released records with Saint Marie Records, Acuarela, Aesthetics, Hefty, Is Collage Collective and Stilll Records.
Costa's photographic work has been exhibited in various art spaces, magazines and web publications.
Costa currently resides in Brooklyn, New York.

Discography
Young Boy, 'Other Summers'                           Saint Marie Records,  2014
L'Altra, 'Telepathic Deluxe Edition'                  Saint Marie Records,  2013
L'Altra, 'Telepathic'                                        Acuarela Discos, And records (JP) 2011
Costa Music, 'Lighter Subjects'                        Stilll Records (UK, EU)  2008
Costa Music, 'Lighter Subjects'                        IsCollageCollective(JAPAN)2007
Costa/Hellner, 'PLAY' Original Score L'Avventura Films 2006
L'Altra, 'Different Days'                              Hefty Records 2005
L'Altra, 'Bring On Happiness EP'                       Hefty Records 2005
L'Altra, 'In The Afternoon'                            Aesthetics 2002
L'Altra, 'Ouletta 7"'                                  Aesthetics 2002
L'Altra, 'Music of a Sinking Occasion'                 Aesthetics 2000
L'Altra, 'S/T EP'                                      Aesthetics 1999

Tracks Appear On
Yeti One	                                       Yeti Publishing LLC  	2000
Compiled Aesthetics  	        2001
Domino 2001 Ancienne Belgique  	2001
POPvolume#2	                                       POPnews  	        2001
VPRO De Avonden XMAS 2001 Amekbelevchrist VPRO  	2001
Acuarela Songs 2 Acuarela Discos  	2003
Sampler 3 Hang Up  	        2003
Hefty 10 Digest + Prefuse73Mixtape 	               Hefty Records  	        2006
Hefty 10th Anniversary Hefty Records 2006

References

External links
http://www.josephdeslercosta.com
http://www.costamusic.net
http://www.myspace.com/thecostamusic

American photographers
American indie rock musicians
1981 births
Living people